Cannonball Run 2001 is a reality television series broadcast on the USA Network in 2001. It was inspired by the Cannonball Baker Sea-To-Shining-Sea Memorial Trophy Dash, an outlaw road race of the 1970s which was the source for the famous Cannonball Run movies. The show featured a series of five location-specific challenges along a New York-to-Los Angeles course, as in the original race.

Development of the series started without the participation of Brock Yates, organizer of the original Cannonball and holder of the trademark; indeed, the production company paid Yates for the use of the name just before the show debuted. Yates was not pleased with the series, as he felt it was fake and staged.

In 2005, Yates teamed up with a Cannonball driver and film producer J Sanchez to produce a more authentic reality series called Cannonball: This Is Reality to run alongside the actual One Lap of America race. The project was shelved in 2006 due to lack of interest from networks.

External links
 
 

USA Network original programming
2000s American reality television series
2001 American television series debuts
2001 American television series endings